Salem Heights may refer to a location in the United States:

Salem Heights, Indiana
Salem Heights, Columbiana County, Ohio
Salem Heights, Hamilton County, Ohio